Saint-Amand is a commune in the Pas-de-Calais department in the Hauts-de-France region of France.

Geography

Population

Places of interest
 The church of St. Amand, dating from the sixteenth century.
 The fifteenth century cemetery chapel.
 The Commonwealth War Graves Commission cemetery.

See also
Communes of the Pas-de-Calais department

References

External links

 The CWGC cemetery

Saintamand